Tisentnops is a genus of South American araneomorph spiders in the family Caponiidae, first described by Norman I. Platnick in 1994.  it contains only three species.

References

Araneomorphae genera
Caponiidae
Spiders of South America